George D'Arcy Boulton (May 20, 1759 – May 21, 1834) was a lawyer, judge and political figure in Upper Canada.  He was a member of the Family Compact, an oligarchic political and social group which dominated the government of the province.

Life and career
The second son of Henry Boulton (1732–1788) J.P., of Moulton, Lincolnshire, by his third wife, Mary (1734–1779), the daughter of D'Arcy Preston of Askham Bryan Hall, Yorkshire. He studied law at the Middle Temple. After his business in England failed in 1793, he came to the Hudson River valley of New York in 1797.

Boulton later moved to Augusta Township in Upper Canada around 1802. In 1803, he was admitted to the bar. In 1807, he became a judge for the Court of King's Bench.

In 1810, while sailing to England, he was taken prisoner by a French privateer. Boulton fought vigorously in the short-lived attempt to defend the ship and for his troubles he received a sabre slash across his forehead; he was kept at Verdun and released in 1813. He was admitted to the English bar in the same year and secured the post of Attorney-General of Upper Canada in December 1814. Boulton and his family were considered to be part of the Family Compact, a clique of Upper Canada's elite who held great power in the province.

Marriage and children
At London in 1782, he married Elizabeth Forster (whose elder sister married D'Arcy's elder brother), daughter and co-heiress of Chief Justice James Forster of the Isle of Ely, Serjeant-at-law, by Susannah, daughter of Sir John Strange.

He died at York (Toronto) in 1834 at The Grange, the home of his son D'Arcy Boulton (1785–1846), Auditor-General of Upper Canada and brother-in-law of Sir John Robinson, 1st Baronet, of Toronto. He was the father of Henry John Boulton and George Strange Boulton, among others, and the grandfather of William Henry Boulton and D'Arcy Boulton (1825–1875).

Legacy
Boulton bequeathed property at what is now Queen Street West and McCaul Street for the creation of a public market in perpetuity. The property, which is still owned by the city, became St. Patrick's Market.

Boulton's sold the north half of his Park Lot 13 to provide land for King's College (now the University of Toronto).

References

External links 
"Boulton of Moulton" in A genealogical and heraldic history of the commoners of Great Britain and Ireland enjoying territorial possessions or high official rank Volume II

1759 births
1834 deaths
English emigrants to pre-Confederation Ontario
Members of the Legislative Assembly of Upper Canada
19th-century Canadian judges
People from Leeds and Grenville United Counties
People from South Holland (district)
Treasurers of the Law Society of Upper Canada
Upper Canada judges
Attorneys-General of Upper Canada
Immigrants to Upper Canada